The fifth season of Cobra Kai, also known as Cobra Kai V, was released to Netflix on September 9, 2022, and consisted of 10 episodes. The series is a direct sequel to the original four films in The Karate Kid franchise, focusing on the characters of Daniel LaRusso and Johnny Lawrence over 30 years after the original film. This is the third season to be released to Netflix.

The season has twelve starring roles, eleven of which returned from the previous season. Dallas Dupree Young was promoted to main cast after recurring in the previous season, and Gianni DeCenzo was demoted to a recurring cast member, being credited as a "special guest star".

The season has been met with generally positive reviews from critics.

Cast and characters

Main
 Ralph Macchio as Daniel LaRusso
 William Zabka as Johnny Lawrence
 Courtney Henggeler as Amanda LaRusso
 Xolo Maridueña as Miguel Diaz
 Tanner Buchanan as Robby Keene
 Mary Mouser as Samantha LaRusso
 Jacob Bertrand as Eli "Hawk" Moskowitz
 Peyton List as Tory Nichols
 Dallas Dupree Young as Kenny Payne
 Vanessa Rubio as Carmen Diaz
 Thomas Ian Griffith as Terry Silver
 Martin Kove as John Kreese

Recurring 
 Gianni DeCenzo as Demetri Alexopoulos
 Yuji Okumoto as Chozen Toguchi
 Alicia Hannah-Kim as Kim Da-eun
 Joe Seo as Kyler Park
 Oona O'Brien as Devon Lee
 Griffin Santopietro as Anthony LaRusso
 Tyron Woodley as Sensei Odell
 Stephen Thompson as Sensei Morozov
 Nathaniel Oh as Nathaniel
 Aedin Mincks as Mitch
 Khalil Everage as Chris
 Owen Morgan as Bert
 Paul Walter Hauser as Raymond Porter / Stingray

Guest 
 Luis Roberto Guzmán as Hector Salazar
 Elvia Hill as Maria
 Sean Kanan as Mike Barnes
 Robyn Lively as Jessica Andrews
 Bret Ernst as Louie LaRusso Jr.
 Dan Ahdoot as Anoush
 Hannah Kepple as Moon
 Annalisa Cochrane as Yasmine
 Rose Bianco as Rosa
 Diora Baird as Shannon Keene
 Terry Serpico as Captain Turner
 Josh Lawson as Owen
 Sunny Mabrey as Lizzie-Ann
 Julia Macchio as Vanessa LaRusso
 EJ Sanchez as Luis
 Nick Marini as young Silver
 Barrett Carnahan as young Kreese
 Sarah Anne as young Kim Da-eun
 Don L. Lee as Kim Sun-yung
 Daniel Sarcos as ring announcer
 Jaden Ponce as Zeke

Episodes

Production

Development 
In August 2021, ahead of the fourth season premiere, the series was renewed for a fifth season.

Casting 
All main cast members from the previous season returned for the fifth, with Gianni DeCenzo now being credited as a "special guest appearance". Sean Kanan and Robyn Lively guest starred as Mike Barnes and Jessica Andrews respectively, reprising their roles from The Karate Kid Part III. In addition to Kanan and Lively returning, Alicia Hannah-Kim joined the cast as Kim Da-eun. Dallas Dupree Young, who portrays Kenny Payne, was upped to a series regular role after recurring during the fourth season.

Filming 
Filming for the fifth season began in September 2021 and finished in December. Like previous seasons, parts were filmed in Atlanta, Georgia, Marietta, Georgia and Los Angeles, California. The Mexico scenes were filmed in Puerto Rico on a two-day filming block, just like the two-day filming block of Okinawa, Japan and the Tokyo Metropolitan Government Building in Tokyo, Japan for the third season.

Marketing and release
The first teaser trailer for the season was released on May 5, 2022, which confirmed a September 9 release date. The official trailer was released on August 16. A home media release has yet to be confirmed, but is likely due to all previous seasons being released on DVD.

Reception 
On the review aggregator website Rotten Tomatoes, the season has received a 98% approval rating, with an average rating of 7.9 out of 10 based on 44 reviews. The site's critical consensus reads: "Deftly managing an expanded roster of punchy personalities, Cobra Kai graduates to a black belt proficiency in heartfelt melodrama and sly humor". On Metacritic, which uses a weighted average, it has received a rating of 78 out of 100, based on seven reviews, indicating "generally favorable reviews".

Between September 4 and October 9, 2022, the show was watched for 274.72M hours globally according to the Netflix top 10s.

References 

Cobra Kai
2022 American television seasons